Zbylut Twardowski is a Polish-American nephrologist, known for his pioneering work on dialysis. His patented dialysis machines and catheters are commonly found in hospitals and dialysis centers worldwide. Twardowski is associated with the Department of Internal Medicine at the University of Missouri in Columbia, Missouri.

External links
Bio at University of Missouri

Year of birth missing (living people)
Living people
Polish nephrologists
Polish emigrants to the United States
University of Missouri faculty
Scientists from Columbia, Missouri